Pop-Rock General, in the music industry, is a music record chart that ranks the best-performing singles in Venezuela, which are collectively on each single's weekly physical and digital sales, as well as airplay, as reported by Record Report.

Chart history

See also
Lead single
List of best-selling singles
List of record charts

References

Pop Rock 2000s
Venezuela Pop Rock